The El Paso Ysleta Port of Entry, is located at the Ysleta–Zaragoza International Bridge.  It was established when the first bridge was built at this location in 1938.  The bridge was rebuilt in 1955, and again in 1990.  The current border inspection station was also constructed at that time.

Traffic at the Ysleta crossing has grown significantly since the new bridge was built, due in part to extreme congestion at the other El Paso bridges, and also to the large number of maquiladora operations that have been established on the east side of Juarez.

References

See also

 List of Mexico–United States border crossings
 List of Canada–United States border crossings

Mexico–United States border crossings
Buildings and structures in El Paso, Texas
1938 establishments in Texas